"Did Ye Get Healed?" is a song written by Northern Irish singer-songwriter Van Morrison and recorded on his 1987 album, Poetic Champions Compose. It was also released as a single in 1987.

Morrison biographer Johnny Rogan describes the song as "A powerful statement of transcendence confirming that the spiritual dimension to his (Morrison's) music was now an overwhelming priority."

Appearance on other albums
It was one of the songs included on Van Morrison's first compilation album, The Best of Van Morrison that was released in 1990 and was one of the best-selling albums of the 1990s.
"Did Ye Get Healed?" is one of the songs featured on the compilation album Still on Top - The Greatest Hits.
The song appears on the 1994 live album A Night in San Francisco.

Personnel
Van Morrison – alto saxophone, vocals
June Boyce – backing vocals
Neil Drinkwater – piano
Martin Drover – flugelhorn  
Roy Jones – drums 
Steve Pearce – bass guitar

Notes

References
Rogan, Johnny (2006). Van Morrison: No Surrender, London:Vintage Books  

1987 singles
Van Morrison songs
Songs written by Van Morrison
1987 songs
Song recordings produced by Van Morrison
Mercury Records singles